Osburn is a city in Shoshone County, Idaho, United States. Located in the Silver Valley mining region of northern Idaho, its population was 1,555 at the 2010 census.

History
The city was named for Bill Osborne, who established a trading post here.

Geography

Demographics

2010 census
At the 2010 census there were 1,555 people in 711 households, including 443 families, in the city. The racial makup of the city was 95.8% White, 0.3% African American, 1.5% Native American, 0.3% Asian, 0.1% Pacific Islander, 0.5% from other races, and 1.6% from two or more races. Hispanic or Latino of any race were 4.2%.

Of the 711 households 24.2% had children under the age of 18 living with them, 51.3% were married couples living together, 6.6% had a female householder with no husband present, 4.4% had a male householder with no wife present, and 37.7% were non-families. 32.9% of households were one person and 15.8% were one person aged 65 or older. The average household size was 2.19 and the average family size was 2.76.

The median age was 48.1 years. 20.5% of residents were under the age of 18; 5.3% were between the ages of 18 and 24; 19.6% were from 25 to 44; 32.1% were from 45 to 64; and 22.4% were 65 or older. The gender makeup of the city was 50.4% male and 49.6% female.

2000 census
At the 2000 census there were 1,545 people in 699 households, including 457 families, in the city. The racial makup of the city was 95.40% White, 0.32% African American, 1.62% Native American, 0.13% Asian, 0.06% Pacific Islander, 0.32% from other races, and 2.14% from two or more races. Hispanic or Latino of any race were 2.33%.

Of the 699 households 23.0% had children under the age of 18 living with them, 54.8% were married couples living together, 7.3% had a female householder with no husband present, and 34.5% were non-families. 29.0% of households were one person and 14.9% were one person aged 65 or older.  The average household size was 2.21 and the average family size was 2.70.

The age distribution was 20.1% under the age of 18, 6.1% from 18 to 24, 24.9% from 25 to 44, 28.3% from 45 to 64, and 20.7% 65 or older.  The median age was 45 years. For every 100 females, there were 98.1 males.  For every 100 females age 18 and over, there were 93.0 males.

The median household income was $29,856 and the median family income  was $34,605. Males had a median income of $31,574 versus $20,769 for females. The per capita income for the city was $17,532.  About 10.1% of families and 11.7% of the population were below the poverty line, including 17.2% of those under age 18 and 4.6% of those age 65 or over.

See also

 List of cities in Idaho

References

External links

Cities in Shoshone County, Idaho
Cities in Idaho